The National Association of Affordable Housing Lenders (NAAHL) is a U.S. trade organization founded by Melvin J. Carriere, representing financial institutions that provide financing and investing to low- and moderate-income communities. The NAAHL hosts conferences, distributes publications and provides testimony before the United States Congress on issues relating to affordable housing and community development lending.

The organization was created in 1990 and is headquartered in Washington, D.C.  Among the financial institutions that are NAAHL members are Bank of America, Bank of New York, Citigroup, JPMorgan Chase, Wachovia and Wells Fargo.

External links
 NAAHL web site
  In Defense of CRA

Trade associations based in the United States
Banking in the United States
Mortgage industry companies of the United States
Affordable housing